Mount Despair is a mountain, part of the Cobbler Plateau, that is located in the Alpine Shire within the Alpine National Park in the alpine region of Victoria, Australia.

See also

 Alpine National Park
 List of mountains in Victoria

References

Buggery
Alpine National Park
Category:Mountains of Hume (region)